This is the chronological list of books by the Austrian school economist and philosopher Friedrich Hayek. The dates in brackets are the original year of publication of the book (not always in English).

The University of Chicago Press has a project called the Collected Works of F.A. Hayek, a planned series of 19 newly edited editions of Hayek’s books with interviews with the author, new editions of his articles and letters, and hitherto unpublished manuscripts.

1920–1929
 Monetary Theory and the Trade Cycle (1929)

1930–1939
 Prices and Production (1931) , with a preface ("Hayek's Legacy") to the 2008 edition by Danny Quah
 "Economy and Knowledge" (1936), article
 Monetary Nationalism and International Stability (1937) 
 Profits, Interest & Investment (1939)

1940–1949
 The Pure Theory of Capital (1941)  Available online.
 The Road to Serfdom (1944)  Available online.
 
 Individualism and Economic Order (1948)  Available online.

1950–1959
 "The Transmission of the Ideals of Economic Freedom," (1951) Full Article
 John Stuart Mill and Harriet Taylor: Their Friendship and Subsequent Marriage (1951) 
 The Counter-Revolution of Science: Studies on the Abuse of Reason (1952) 
 The Sensory Order: An Inquiry into the Foundations of Theoretical Psychology (1952) 
 Capitalism and the Historians (1954) 
 The Political Ideal of the Rule of Law (1955)

1960–1969
 The Constitution of Liberty (1960) 
 The Constitution of Liberty: The Definitive Edition (2011). Ronald Hamowy, ed., v. 17, The Collected Works of F A. Hayek. Description and preview.
 Studies in Philosophy, Politics and Economics (1967) 
 Freiburger Studien: Gesammelte Aufsatze (1969)

1970–1979
 A Tiger by the Tail : The Keynesian Legacy of Inflation (1972, revised edition 1978). Issued in 1979 as "Cato Paper No. 6" by the Cato Institute) 
 Law, Legislation and Liberty: A New Statement of the Liberal Principles of Justice and Political Economy:
 Volume I. Rules and Order (1973) 
 Volume II. The Mirage of Social Justice (1976) 
 Volume III. The Political Order of a Free People (1979) 
 The Denationalisation of Money: An Analysis of the Theory and Practice of Concurrent Currencies (1976) 
 New Studies in Philosophy, Politics, Economics and the History of Ideas (1978)

1980–1989
 1980s Unemployment and the Unions (1980) 
 The Fatal Conceit: The Errors of Socialism (1988)

Later publications
 Hayek, Friedrich (1992). The Fortunes of Liberalism: Essays on Austrian Economics and the Ideal of Freedom, edited by Peter G. Klein (University of Chicago Press) . 
 Hayek, Friedrich (2010). Studies on the Abuse and Decline of Reason: Text and Documents, edited by Bruce Caldwell (University of Chicago Press) (essays in opposition to positivism.) . 
 Hayek, Friedrich (2015). Hayek on Mill: The Mill-Taylor Friendship and Related Writings, edited by Sandra J. Peart (University of Chicago Press) .

References

External links
 Hayek material at the Ludwig von Mises Institute
 Hayek: A Bibliography of his Writings from the Online Library of Liberty (Liberty Fund)
 The Collected Works of F. A. Hayek page (University of Chicago Press)

Austrian School publications
Bibliographies by writer
Bibliographies of Austrian writers
Bibliographies of economics
 
Philosophy bibliographies